Kengzi station is a station on Line 14 of Shenzhen Metro in Shenzhen, Guangdong, China, which is opened on 28 October 2022. It is located at the east of the intersection of Pingshan Avenue and Guangzu North Road, Pingshan District. The station lies east-west along Pingshan Avenue.

History
In March 2018, Shenzhen Metro Group Co., Ltd. released the Environmental Impact Report of Shenzhen Urban Rail Transit Line 14 Project, which includes this station.

On April 22, 2022, Shenzhen Municipal Bureau of Planning and Natural Resources issued the Announcement on the Approval Scheme of Shenzhen Rail Transit Phase IV Station Name Plan, in which the station will continue to use the name, Kengzi Station.

The station's main structure was topped out on 28 August 2020, making it the fourth station on Shenzhen Metro Line 14 to be topped out.

On October 28, 2022, the station was opened together with Shenzhen Metro Line 14.

Station layout
The station has an area of 17,312 square meters.

Exits
Kengzi station has four exits, of which Exit A and C are equipped with elevators and Exit C is equipped with toilets.

Location

The station is on Pingshan Avenue, Pingshan District, Shenzhen. It is near Guangzu Middle School (光祖中学), Kengzi Central Primary School (坑梓中心小学), Pingshan District Maternal and Child Hospital (坪山区妇幼保健院), and Pingle Bone Trauma Hospital (平乐骨伤科医院).

References

External links
 Shenzhen Metro Kengzi Station (Chinese)
 Shenzhen Metro Kengzi Station (English)

Railway stations in Guangdong
Shenzhen Metro stations
Railway stations in China opened in 2022